The Police and Fire Reform (Scotland) Act 2012 is an Act of the Scottish Parliament. This legislation merged the eight separate police forces and fire and rescue services in Scotland, plus several central agencies, into single agencies covering the whole of Scotland. These new agencies, Police Scotland and the Scottish Fire and Rescue Service, formally came into being on 1 April 2013.

By establishing the Scottish Police Authority and the Police Service of Scotland, it replaced the arrangements previously set out in the Police (Scotland) Act 1967.

The legislation also made provision for the Auditor General for Scotland to become responsible for auditing the Scottish Police Authority, and the Scottish Fire and Rescue Service.

See also 
 Police and Fire Services (Finance) (Scotland) Act 2001
 Fire (Scotland) Act 2005

References

External links
Police and Fire Reform (Scotland) Act 2012

Acts of the Scottish Parliament 2012
Fire and rescue services of Scotland
Law enforcement in Scotland